Lee Joon-kyung (born March 28, 1990) better known by his stage name Dok2 (pronounced as Dokki), is a South Korean rapper, record producer and co-founder of now-defunct Illionaire Records.

Biography

Early life
Dok2's mother is Korean, and his father is of Filipino and Spanish descent.

While media outlets reported in 2014 that he is a first cousin of Nicole Scherzinger, an American singer formerly of the girl group the Pussycat Dolls, Dok2 said in a 2015 interview, "The report about me being first cousins with Nicole Scherzinger is wrong. We share the same blood, but the relationship is complicated. I haven’t even met her."

Career beginnings
His first music appearance is when he was 12, when he performed "FEVER" with Jo-PD & Hype at the 2002 Mnet Music Video Festival

Dok2 signed to Future Flow Entertainment when he was 13 years old. By the time he was out of his teenage years, he had written and produced songs for established Korean hip hop groups, including Drunken Tiger, Dynamic Duo and Epik High.

In 2006, under the name All Black, Dok2 and fellow teen rapper Microdot released the album Chapter 1.

He released his first solo mini-album, Thunderground, under Epik High's now defunct Map the Soul label in 2009.

Illionaire Records and Activity in the United States
In 2011, Dok2 and rapper The Quiett formed Illionaire Records. Despite its small size, Illionaire Records is considered one of the most influential hip hop record labels in South Korea due to the popularity of its artists. He also founded sub-label Ambition Musik below the label. 

He gained mainstream popularity through his album Multillionaire and his single "1llusion," both of which peaked on music charts in South Korea. He also worked with several artists outside of the label, including GroovyRoom, G-Dragon, and Kim Junsu.

In November of 2018, Dok2 resigned as CEO of the company and began activity in the United States. He announced the formation of the group "PO$TA BOY$" with Tyga in 2019 and ultimately left Illionaire Records on February 6 of 2020.

In April of 2021, Dok2 announced via his Instagram that he had signed with Tyga's Last Kings Records.

Show Me the Money
In 2014, Dok2 was a judge on the third season of the TV rap competition Show Me the Money, where he and The Quiett were the producers behind winning contestant Bobby of the band iKon. They again participated in the show's fifth season and were the producers behind Superbee, who came in third place. Dok2 again participated in Season 6 as part of a producer team with Jay Park (AOMG and H1GHR Music).

Filmography

Discography

Studio albums

Extended plays

Mixtapes

Singles

Collaborations

Awards and nominations

References

External links

 

1990 births
South Korean male rappers
South Korean hip hop record producers
Living people
South Korean people of Filipino descent